Doreen Allen (1879 – 18 June 1963) was a militant English suffragette and member of the Women's Social and Political Union (WSPU), who on being imprisoned was force-fed, for which she received the WSPU's Hunger Strike Medal 'For Valour'.

Life 
She was born in Dartford in Kent as Edith Doreen Allchin, one of ten children of Mary Ann née Amos (1838–1924) and John James Allchin (1836–1903), a builder. In 1905 she married Melville Hodsoll Allen (1879–1932) who worked at the Stock Exchange in London and who served in World War I as a captain in the Queen's Own Royal West Kent Regiment.

Following her arrest in March 1912 for taking part in a window smashing campaign she appeared at Bow Street Magistrates' Court on 12 March 1912,  before being sent for trial at the London Sessions on 19 March 1912, when she was sentenced to four months imprisonment in Holloway Prison; in prison she went on hunger strike and was force-fed. 

A fellow-prisoner in Holloway was Mary Ann Aldham and the signatures of the two appear on The Suffragette Handkerchief embroidered by Janie Terrero. To keep up morale in prison, the women were forced to make their own entertainment. Some such as Emmeline Pethick-Lawrence told stories while Doreen Allen sat at her feet with an arm on her knee; later Emmeline Pankhurst reminisced about the early days of the WSPU. On 10 June 1912 the three imprisoned grandmothers - Gertrude Wilkinson (aka Jessie Howard), Janet Boyd and Mary Ann Aldham sang together. On another occasion some of the women performed a scene from The Merchant of Venice with Evaline Hilda Burkitt as Shylock and the role of Narissa played by Allen. On her release Allen resumed her political activities on behalf of women's suffrage.

When WSPU leader Emmeline Pankhurst returned to Great Britain from America in late 1913, she was met at Plymouth by a group suffragettes which included Doreen Allen. As Pankhurst disembarked from the Majestic she was arrested under the Cat and Mouse Act and taken to Exeter Prison.
 
in her later years Doreen Allen lived in Brighton in Sussex. She died in June 1963.

Her nephew was Sir Geoffrey Cuthbert Allchin KCBE, CMG, MC (1895–1968), British Ambassador in Morocco.

See also 

 Women's suffrage in the United Kingdom
 Hunger Strike Medal
 The Suffragette Handkerchief

References

1879 births
1963 deaths
People from Dartford
English suffragettes
English feminists
British women's rights activists
Women's Social and Political Union
Prisoners and detainees of England and Wales
Hunger Strike Medal recipients